KKTW-LD, virtual and UHF digital channel 19, is a low-powered Heartland-affiliated television station licensed to Minneapolis, Minnesota, United States. The station is owned by Luken Communications. The station's broadcast facility is located on a microwave tower near the intersection of Highway 55 and Interstate 494 in Plymouth, broadcasting a tight, east-facing pattern.

History

As K19BG, the station used to be the St. Cloud translator for the Trinity Broadcasting Network at 122 kilowatts for most of the analog age. The station was sold to Luken Communications in June 2011 as part of TBN's pullout from their extensive translator network.

The station changed its call sign to KKTW-LP on September 20, 2017, and then to KKTW-LD on October 26, 2017 upon issuance of their digital license.

In early November 2020, the station went on the air.

Digital Channels
The station's digital signal is multiplexed:

References

 Luken buys 78 former TBN stations from MMTC - 6/13/2011
 TBN donates up to 155 stations to MMTC - 8/23/2010

Television stations in Minnesota
Television channels and stations established in 1987
1987 establishments in Minnesota
Low-power television stations in the United States
Heartland (TV network) affiliates
Retro TV affiliates
Rev'n affiliates